Kwun Yam Shan is a mountain located in northern Hong Kong near Kadoorie Farm.

Geography 
Kwun Yam Shan is 546 metres (1,791 feet) in height, to the north of Tai Mo Shan, the tallest mountain in Hong Kong.

Hiking 
Kwun Yam Shan is a popular destination for springtime cherry blossom viewing.

See also 
 List of mountains, peaks and hills in Hong Kong
 Kwun Yam

References

External links 

 Best Places for Cherry Blossoms in Hong Kong

Yuen Long District